Annemarie Steinsieck (21 September 1889 – 29 August 1977) was a German actress. She was married to actor Hugo Werner-Kahle.

Selected filmography
 The Duke of Reichstadt (1920) 
 Modern Vices (1924)
 Dear Homeland (1929)
 Ariane (1931)
 So Ended a Great Love (1934)
 Hermine and the Seven Upright Men (1935)
 If It Were Not for Music (1935)
 Fresh Wind from Canada (1935)
 One Too Many on Board (1935)
 A Strange Guest (1936)
 Family Parade (1936)
 The Mysterious Mister X (1936)
 A Woman of No Importance (1936)
 The Divine Jetta (1937)
 Another World (1937) 
 Freight from Baltimore (1938)
 The Great and the Little Love (1938)
 Friedemann Bach (1941)

References

External links

1889 births
1977 deaths
Actresses from Berlin
German stage actresses
German film actresses
German silent film actresses
20th-century German actresses